A. Muhamed Mustaque (born as Muhamed Mustaque Ayumantakath on 1 June 1967) is the permanent Judge of the Kerala High Court since 10 March 2016 and Chairman of the Computerisation Committee of the High Court since 18 September 2019, the highest court in the Kerala and Lakshadweep located at Kochi, Ernakulam.

Early life and education
Mustaque was born in Thana, Kannur, Kerala on 1June1967. He graduated in Law from the Vaikunta Baliga College of Law in Udupi, Karnataka and obtained post-graduation in law from Mahatma Gandhi University, Kerala. Thereafter he obtained his next post-graduation in space and telecommunication law from Paris XI University, studied private international law course at The Hague Academy of International Law, advanced course on e-commerce and intellectual property from the World Intellectual Property Organization and trained as a mediator by a European team from the United Kingdom and MCPC of the Supreme Court of India.

Career
Mustaque enrolled as an advocate in 1989 and started practising in various courts and statutory authorities in Kannur and served for around sevenyears mainly as a litigation lawyer and arbitrator. He served as a mediator at Kerala Mediation Centre. While practising, he served as standing counsel for Kannur University. He appeared for several educational institutions, telecom companies, local authorities and others and served as a faculty for training on mediation with the Indian Institute of Arbitration and Mediation, panel arbitrator at ICADR AND IIAM and a member of the International Institute of Space Law and Indian Society of International Law.

Mustaque also served as managing editor of the online legal news letter L.I.N.K, charter member and treasurer of India International ADR Association and secretary of Mediators' Council of India. On 23January2014, he was appointed an additional judge of the Kerala High Court and became a permanent judge from 10March2016.

References

Living people
1967 births
Judges of the Kerala High Court
21st-century Indian judges